William of Exeter (died 1365) was an English writer.

The author of a course of sermons on the Beatitudes, who must have flourished much earlier than the above-named William, since the Laudian manuscript of his work (Laud. MS., Miscell. 368, f. 106, Bodl. Libr.) cannot be later than the beginning of the thirteenth century; yet this writer's death is placed by Wood in 1365.

References

Year of birth missing
1365 deaths
14th-century English writers
English religious writers
Writers from Exeter